The 2012 European Curling Championships was held from December 7 to 15 at the Löfbergs Lila Arena and the Karlstad Curling Club in Karlstad, Sweden. The Group A competitions was held at the Löfbergs Lila Arena, while the Group B competitions was held at the Karlstad Curling Club. The 2012 European Curling Championships marked the fourth time that Sweden hosted the European Curling Championships. The Group C competitions were held from October 5 to 10 in Erzurum, Turkey.

Russia's Anna Sidorova, last year's runner-up, won the gold medal in the women's tournament after defeating last year's champions Scotland, skipped by Eve Muirhead, in the final in an extra end. Sweden's Margaretha Sigfridsson won the bronze medal over Denmark's Lene Nielsen. In the men's tournament, Sweden's Niklas Edin won their second title by defeating two-time consecutive champion Thomas Ulsrud of Norway. Jiří Snítil of the Czech Republic improved on his record at the European Championships by winning the bronze medal over last year's bronze medalists Denmark, skipped by Rasmus Stjerne.

A total of eight men's and seven women's teams qualified for the 2013 World Curling Championships. On the men's side, Sweden, the Czech Republic, Norway, Denmark, Russia, Switzerland, Scotland, and Finland (who defeated France in the World Challenge Games), qualified for the 2013 Ford World Men's Curling Championship. On the women's side, Russia, Scotland, Sweden, Denmark, Switzerland, Italy and Germany qualified for the 2013 World Women's Curling Championship and joined hosts Latvia in competition.

Men

Group A
The Group A competitions was contested in Karlstad. Ten teams, including the teams advancing from last year's Group B competitions (Hungary and Russia), competed in a round robin. The top four teams in the round robin moved on to the playoffs. In the page playoffs, Sweden defeated the Czech Republic, and Norway edged past Denmark. Norway then secured a close win over the Czech Republic, and the Czechs moved to the bronze medal game, where they defeated Denmark in a rematch of last year's bronze medal game. Sweden then defeated Norway in the gold medal game with a final score of 8–5 after hitting to win the game in the tenth end.

Round-robin standings
Final round-robin standings

Playoffs

Bronze-medal game
Friday, December 14, 20:00

Gold-medal game
Saturday, December 15, 15:00

Group B
The Group B competitions were contested in Karlstad. Sixteen teams, including the teams advancing from the same year's Group C competitions (Turkey and Croatia), competed in a two group round robin. The top four teams in the round robin moved on to the playoffs. Latvia, the leader of the Blue Group, defeated Finland, the leader of the Red Group, and advanced to the final, while the Netherlands, the second-ranked team in the Blue Group, defeated England, the runner-up of the Red Group, and advanced to the semifinal. Finland defeated the Netherlands in the semifinal and moved on to the gold medal game, where they defeated Latvia to win the Group B competitions. The Netherlands defeated England in the bronze medal game.

Finland and Latvia advanced to the 2013 Group A competitions, and Finland played France in the World Challenge Games, where Finland defeated France in a best-of-three series to win the final berth at the 2013 World Men's Curling Championship. Wales and Ireland were relegated to the 2013 Group C competitions.

Round-robin standings
Final round-robin standings

Playoffs

Bronze-medal game
Friday, December 14, 13:00

Gold-medal game
Friday, December 14, 13:00

Group C
The Group C competitions were contested in Erzurum, where the 2012 European Mixed Curling Championship was also held. Seven men's teams competed for two berths to the Group B competitions, which were held in Karlstad. The teams played in a round robin, and at its conclusion, the top four teams advanced to the playoffs, which were held in a format similar to that of the World Wheelchair Curling Championship qualification events. Turkey advanced to the Group B competitions after winning the first semifinal game, and Croatia advanced to the Group B competition after winning the second place game.

Round-robin standings
Final round-robin standings

Playoffs

Women

Group A
The Group A competitions were contested in Karlstad. Ten teams, including the teams advancing from last year's Group B competitions (Finland and Hungary), competed in a round robin. The top four teams in the round robin moved on to the playoffs. In the page playoffs, Scotland defeated Sweden, and Russia edged Denmark. Russia then stole the win against Sweden in the semifinal in an extra end, and advanced to the final, where they won with a score of 6–5 in an extra end over Scotland. Sweden defeated Denmark in the bronze medal game with a score of 9–3.

Round-robin standings
Final round-robin standings

Playoffs

Bronze-medal game
Friday, December 14, 20:00

Gold-medal game
Saturday, December 15, 10:00

Group B
The Group B competitions were contested in Karlstad. Ten teams, including the teams advancing from the same year's Group C competitions (Belarus and Turkey), competed in a round robin. The top four teams in the round robin moved on to the playoffs. In the page playoffs, undefeated Norway defeated Estonia, and Latvia defeated Austria. Latvia swept Estonia in the semifinal in nine ends, sending Estonia to play Austria for the bronze medal. Latvia defeated Norway to win the Group B competitions with a score of 7–3, and Austria recorded a win over Estonia in the bronze medal game.

Latvia and Norway advanced to the 2013 Group A competitions, and Belarus and Slovakia were relegated to the 2013 Group C competitions.

Round-robin results
Final round-robin standings

Playoffs

Bronze-medal game
Friday, December 14, 13:00

Gold-medal game
Friday, December 14, 13:00

Group C
The Group C competitions were contested in Erzurum, where the 2012 European Mixed Curling Championship was also held. Six women's teams competed for two berths to the Group B competitions, which were held in Karlstad. The teams played in a round robin, and at its conclusion, the top four teams advanced to the playoffs, which were held in a format similar to that of the World Wheelchair Curling Championship qualification events. Belarus advanced to the Group B competitions after winning the first semifinal game, and Turkey advanced to the Group B competition after winning the second place game.

Round-robin standings
Final round-robin standings

Playoffs

References
General

Specific

External links

European Curling Federation Home Page

European Curling Championships
European Championships
European Curling Championships
Eu
Sports competitions in Karlstad
2012 in European sport
International curling competitions hosted by Sweden
International curling competitions hosted by Turkey